"Photograph of Mary" is a song  performed by American contemporary R&B singer Trey Lorenz, issued as the second single from his eponymous debut studio album. In 1993, the song peaked at #46 on the Billboard R&B chart, but it fared better on the dance chart where it peaked at #6.

Music video
The official music video for the song was directed by German director Marcus Nispel.

Charts

References

External links
 
 

1992 songs
1992 singles
Epic Records singles
Trey Lorenz songs
Music videos directed by Marcus Nispel
Song recordings produced by Walter Afanasieff
Song recordings produced by Mariah Carey
Songs written by Seth Swirsky
Dance-pop songs